The 1994 Cleveland Indians corked bat incident took place on July 15, 1994, at Comiskey Park in Chicago during a game between the Cleveland Indians and the Chicago White Sox.

In the first inning, White Sox manager Gene Lamont was tipped off that Indians batter Albert Belle was using a corked baseball bat.  Under the rules of Major League Baseball, a manager may challenge one opponent's baseball bat per game.  Lamont challenged Belle's bat with umpire Dave Phillips, who confiscated the bat and locked it in the umpires' dressing room.

The theft
The Indians, knowing the bat was indeed corked, dispatched relief pitcher Jason Grimsley to retrieve the bat.  Grimsley took a bat belonging to Indians player Paul Sorrento and accessed the area above the false ceiling in the clubhouse and crawled across with a flashlight in his mouth until he reached the umpires' room.  He switched Belle's bat with Sorrento's and returned to the clubhouse.  During the sixth inning, the umpires' custodian noticed clumps of ceiling tile on the floor of the umpire's room, plus twisted metal brackets in the ceiling.  After the game, Phillips noticed the bats were different when he saw that the replacement bat was not as shiny and also was stamped with Sorrento's signature.  The Chicago police were called and the White Sox threatened charges against the burglar.  An investigation that Saturday was carried out by a former FBI agent flown in by MLB.  The equipment room was dusted for fingerprints and the path the burglar took was discovered.

Recovery and judgment
The Indians were ordered by the American League to produce Belle's original, unaltered bat. Initially, the AL had threatened to involve the FBI in regards to the burglary, but they dropped the issue in exchange for the bat. On July 18, the bat was sent to MLB in New York where it was x-rayed and then sawed in half in the presence of Belle and Indians GM John Hart. The bat was found to be corked and Belle was suspended by the AL for 10 games. On appeal, his suspension was dropped to seven games. The reduction made no difference in the end, as Major League Baseball soon suspended play due to the 1994-95 players strike.

Grimsley comes clean
Initially, Grimsley's participation in the "caper" was a secret.  In 1999, when he was a pitcher for the New York Yankees, Grimsley revealed his participation in an interview with The New York Times.  He stated that he had used Sorrento's bat to replace Belle's because all of Belle's bats were corked.  This story was corroborated by Indians shortstop Omar Vizquel in his 2002 book, where he confirmed that all of Belle's bats were indeed corked.

References

External links
Box score at Retrosheet

Cleveland Indians corked bat incident
Chicago White Sox
Cleveland Indians
Major League Baseball games
Major League Baseball controversies
1994 in sports in Illinois
Baseball bats
July 1994 sports events in the United States
Cheating in baseball
1990s in Chicago
Sports competitions in Chicago